Meghraj Dhannu (born 25 October 1940) is an Indian former cricketer. He played for several domestic first-class cricket teams in India between 1958 and 1973.

See also
 List of Delhi cricketers

References

External links
 

1940 births
Living people
Indian cricketers
Delhi cricketers
Punjab, India cricketers
Southern Punjab cricketers
Place of birth missing (living people)